Bazerman is a surname. Notable people with the surname include:

Charles Bazerman (born 1945), American educator and scholar
Max H. Bazerman (born 1955), American academic